James Crosbie was an Irish Fine Gael politician, barrister and journalist. He was a member of Seanad Éireann from 1938 to 1951 and from 1954 to 1957. He was elected to the 2nd Seanad in March 1938 by the Industrial and Commercial Panel. He was re-elected to the 3rd Seanad by the Cultural and Educational Panel in August 1938. At the 1943, 1944 and 1948 elections he was elected again by the Industrial and Commercial Panel. He lost his seat at the 1951 election, but was re-elected at the 1954 election this time by the Cultural and Educational Panel. He was defeated again at the 1957 election.

References

Year of birth missing
Year of death missing
Irish barristers
Members of the 2nd Seanad
Members of the 3rd Seanad
Members of the 4th Seanad
Members of the 5th Seanad
Members of the 6th Seanad
Members of the 8th Seanad
Fine Gael senators